Caecina Mavortius Basilius Decius ( 486–510) was a Roman politician under Odoacer's rule. He was  consul and Praefectus urbi of Rome in 486 and Praetorian prefect of Italy from 486 to 493.

Life 
Decius was the son of Caecina Decius Basilius, consul in 463, and brother of Decius Marius Venantius Basilius (consul in 484), and Basilius (consul in 480, identified with Caecina Decius Maximus Basilius); thus he was member of the gens Caecinia. He had a son, Vettius Agorius Basilius Mavortius, who was consul in 527.

Decius returned to favor under the rule of Theodoric the Great, by reclaiming a portion of the Pontine Marshes at his own expense. He was praised for this in a letter signed by Theodoric, and Decius set up an inscription at Terracina stating this was done by the command of king Theodoric. Around 510, Decius was one of five senators appointed to investigate charges that the vir inlustris Basilius and Praetextatus had practiced black magic.

Notes

Bibliography 
 Bury, John Bagnell, History of the Later Roman Empire, vol. 1 (Courier Dover Publications, 1958) , p. 409. (The reference is both very slight and secondary, and should probably be omitted; but if kept, the work is online in its entirety, and the passage is here.)

5th-century Romans
5th-century Roman consuls
Caecinae
Caecina Mavortius Basilius
Imperial Roman consuls
Praetorian prefects of Italy
Urban prefects of Rome
Year of death unknown
Year of birth unknown